This article lists notable unsolved problems in biology.

General biology

Evolution and origins of life
Origin of life. Exactly how, where, and when did life on Earth originate? Which, if any, of the many hypotheses is correct? What were the metabolic pathways used by the earliest life forms?
Origins of viruses. Exactly how and when did different groups of viruses originate?
Development and evolution of brain. How and why did the brain evolve? What are the molecular determinants of individual brain development?
Origin of Eukaryotes (Symbiogenesis). How and why did cells combine to form the eukaryotic cell? Did one or more random events lead to the first eukaryotic cells, or can the formation of eukaryotic cells be explained by physical and biological principles? How did the mitochondria's mitosis cycle come in sync with its host cell? Did the mitochondria or the nucleus develop first in eukaryotes?
Last Universal Common Ancestor. What were the characteristics of the Last Universal Common Ancestor of Archaea, Bacteria, and Eukaryotes? Did Archaea and Eukaryotes evolve out of the domain Bacteria or to a clade basal to it? Do Archaea and Eukaryotes share a later or earlier common ancestor to Bacteria?

Biochemistry and cell biology

What do all the unknown proteins do?  Almost two decades since the first eukaryotes were sequenced, the "biological role" of around 20% of proteins are still unknown. Many of these proteins are conserved across most eukaryotic species and some are conserved in bacteria, indicating a role fundamental for life.
Determinants of cell size. How do cells determine what size to grow to before dividing?
Golgi apparatus. In cell theory, what is the exact transport mechanism by which proteins travel through the Golgi apparatus?
Mechanism of action of drugs. The mechanisms of action of many drugs including lithium, thalidomide and ketamine are not completely understood.
Protein folding. What is the folding code? What is the folding mechanism? Can we predict the native structure of a protein from its amino acid sequence? Is it possible to predict the secondary, tertiary and quaternary structure of a polypeptide sequence based solely on the sequence and environmental information? Inverse protein-folding problem: Is it possible to design a polypeptide sequence which will adopt a given structure under certain environmental conditions? This was achieved for several small globular proteins in 2008. In 2020, it was announced that Google's AlphaFold, a neural network based on DeepMind artificial intelligence, is capable of predicting a protein's final shape based solely on its amino-acid chain with an accuracy of around 90% on a test sample of proteins used by the team.
Enzyme kinetics:  Why do some enzymes exhibit faster-than-diffusion kinetics?
RNA folding problem:  Is it possible to accurately predict the secondary, tertiary and quaternary structure of a polyribonucleic acid sequence based on its sequence and environment?
Protein design:  Is it possible to design highly active enzymes de novo for any desired reaction?
Biosynthesis:  Can desired molecules, natural products or otherwise, be produced in high yield through biosynthetic pathway manipulation?
What is the mechanism of allosteric transitions of proteins? The concerted and sequential models have been hypothesised but neither has been verified.
What are the endogenous ligands of orphan receptors?
What substance is endothelium-derived hyperpolarizing factor?

Other
Why does biological aging occur? There are a number of hypotheses as to why senescence occurs including those that it is programmed by gene expression changes and that it is the accumulative damage of biological processes, but these lack explanatory power.

How do organs grow to the correct shape and size? How are the final shape and size of organs so reliably formed? These processes are in part controlled by the Hippo signaling pathway.
Can developing biological systems tell the time? To an extent, this appears to be the case, as shown by the CLOCK gene.
Star jelly. A complete explanation about its origins is still lacking.
Forest rings. The origin of forest rings is not known, despite several mechanisms for their creation having been proposed. Such hypotheses include radially growing fungus, buried kimberlite pipes, trapped gas pockets, and meteorite impact craters.

Human biology

Handedness: It is unclear how handedness develops, what purpose it serves, why right-handedness is far more common, and why left-handedness exists.
Laughter: While it is generally accepted that laughing evolved as a form of social communication, the exact neurobiological process that leads humans to laugh is not well understood.
Yawning: It is yet to be established what the biological or social purpose of yawning is.
Heritable components of homosexuality: How to reconcile evolution with the heritable components of human homosexuality? Homosexuality is prevalent across human societies, past and present, and is currently responsible for reduced fecundity. These facts constitute an evolutionary puzzle.
Decline in male sperm counts: It is unclear what is causing the steady decline of sperm counts worldwide since the twentieth century.
Decline in average human body temperature since the 19th century: Medical data suggests that the average body temperature has declined 0.6 °C since the 19th century. The cause is unclear although it has been suggested that it has some relation with reduced inflammation from reduced exposure to microorganisms.
Why are there blood types? It is unclear what the origin and purpose of having blood types is. It is thought that O blood may be an adaptation to malaria and that different blood types respond to different diseases but this hypothesis has yet to be proven. Why did these antigens develop in the first place? What accounts for the differences in blood type? How ancient are the differences in blood types? What accounts for the large number of rare non ABO blood types?  What role do blood types have in fighting disease?
Photic sneeze effect: What causes the photic sneeze effect? Why is it so common yet not universal?
Human sex pheromones: There is contradictory evidence on the existence of human pheromones. Do they actually exist, and if so, how do they affect behavior?
Existence of the Grafenberg spot (G-spot): Does the G-spot actually exist? If so is it present in all women? What exactly is it?

Neuroscience and cognition

Neurophysiology

Cognition and psychology

Non-human biology

Ecology, evolution, and paleontology
Unsolved problems relating to the interactions between organisms and their distribution in the environment include:
Paradox of the plankton. The high diversity of phytoplankton seems to violate the competitive exclusion principle.
Cambrian explosion. What is the cause of the apparent rapid diversification of multicellular animal life around the beginning of the Cambrian, resulting in the emergence of almost all modern animal phyla?

Darwin's abominable mystery of botany/plants. What is the exact evolutionary history of flowers and what is the cause of the apparently sudden appearance of nearly modern flowers in the fossil record?
Adult form of Facetotecta. The adult form of this animal has never been encountered in the water, and it remains a mystery what it grows into.
Origin of snakes. Did snakes evolve from burrowing lizards or aquatic lizards? There is evidence for both hypotheses.
Origin of turtles. Did turtles evolve from anapsids or diapsids? There is evidence for both hypotheses.
Ediacaran biota. How should Ediacaran biota be classified? Even what kingdom they belong to is unclear. Why were they so decisively displaced by Cambrian biota?

Ethology
Unsolved problems relating to the behaviour of animals include:
Homing. A satisfactory explanation for the neurobiological mechanisms that allow homing in animals has yet to be found.
Flocking (behavior). How flocks of birds and bats coordinate their movements so quickly is not fully understood. Nor is the purpose of large flocks like those of starlings which seem to invite predators rather than protect them.
Butterfly migration. How do the descendants of monarch butterfly all over Canada and the US eventually, after migrating for several generations, manage to return to a few relatively small overwintering spots?
Blue whale. There is not much data on the sexuality of the blue whale.
Gall-inducing insects. At least seven groups of insects, in six orders, have independently evolved the gall-inducing habit. Several adaptation hypotheses have been proposed, but it is largely unknown why this habit evolved and how gall-inducing insects induce gall formation in plants; chemical, mechanical, and viral triggers have been discussed.

Non-human organs and biomolecules
Unsolved problems relating to the structure and function of non-human organs, processes and biomolecules include:
Korarchaeota (archaea). The metabolic processes of this phylum of archaea are so far unclear.
Glycogen body. The function of this structure in the spinal cord of birds is not known.
Arthropod head problem. A long-standing zoological dispute concerning the segmental composition of the heads of the various arthropod groups, and how they are evolutionarily related to each other.
Ovaries of basking sharks. Only the right ovary in female basking sharks appears to function. The reason is unknown.
Brightly colored bird eggs. It is unknown what evolutionary process would lead birds to having brightly colored eggs given the increased visibility to predators.
Stegosaur osteoderms/scutes. There is a long-standing debate over whether the primary function of the osteoderms/scutes of stegosaurs is protection from predators, sexual display, species recognition, thermoregulation, or other functions.

Artificial life
Unsolved problems in artificial life include:
How does life arise from the nonliving?
What are the potentials and limits of living systems?
How is life related to mind, machines, and culture?

See also
List of unsolved problems in neuroscience

References

Unsolved problems
Biology